Jovin (also Romanized as Jovīn, Jowīn, and Joveyn; also known as Gūyak, Gūyīk, Guyyak, and Jūbon) is a village in Dashtabi-ye Gharbi Rural District, Dashtabi District, Buin Zahra County, Qazvin Province, Iran. At the 2006 census, its population was 412, in 96 families.

References 

Populated places in Buin Zahra County